Vladimirovka is a rural locality (a selo) in Petropavlovskoye Rural Settlement, Liskinsky District, Voronezh Oblast, Russia. The population was 460 as of 2010. There are 9 streets.

Geography 
Vladimirovka is located 48 km southeast of Liski (the district's administrative centre) by road. Petropavlovka is the nearest rural locality.

References 

Rural localities in Liskinsky District